Irish Ferries is an Irish ferry and transport company that operates passenger and freight services on routes between Ireland, Britain and Continental Europe, including Dublin Port–Holyhead; Rosslare Europort to Pembroke as well as Dublin Port-Cherbourg in France.

The company is a division of the Irish Continental Group (ICG) which trades on the Irish Stock Exchange and the London Stock Exchange. ICG also owns the Eucon container line which operates vessels on routes operating between Ireland and the continent.

Irish Ferries' flagship, MV Ulysses, is currently the largest ROPAX ferry operating on the Irish Sea and when launched in 2001 was the world's largest car ferry in terms of car-carrying capacity. The company also charters in a ro-pax vessel, . The company used to charter  which was sold to Interisland Line, and Pride of Bilbao which was sold to St. Peter Line in 2013 and then renamed Princess Anastasia.

History
Irish Continental Line was formed in 1973 as a joint venture between Irish Shipping, Fearnley & Eger and Swedish company Lion Ferry. It originally operated on the Rosslare–Le Havre route with the 547 berth, 210 car ferry Saint Patrick. When Irish Shipping went into liquidation in 1984, Irish Continental Line was sold off in a management buyout and emerged as Irish Continental Group.

In 1992, ICG took over the British and Irish Steam Packet Company Limited, a nationalised company which traded under the name B&I Line and operated ferry services between Dublin and Holyhead and between Rosslare and Pembroke Dock.

In 2005, Irish Ferries replaced all its workers with foreign agency labour that was cheaper than that of its rivals, such as P&O Ferries, Stena Line and DFDS, thereby undercutting their prices. Its competitive practice, as well as the use of security personnel to carry out the replacement of its crewmembers, were described by many in the industry as a "blueprint" for P&O's 2022 sacking of hundreds of its seafarers.

Investment
As part of its offer to buy B&I Line, management at ICG undertook to invest in replacing what was an ageing fleet. Over the following decade, a programme of fleet renewal was undertaken involving investment of €500 million to create what was described as the most modern ferry fleet in western Europe (1). 
 
New vessels were built such as Ulysses, Isle of Innisfree (now on charter in New Zealand as Kaitaki), Isle of Inishmore and a fast ferry Jonathan Swift, all for service on its Ireland–UK routes. As a result, the company put itself in a position to attract increased passenger and freight business, influenced by the modern facilities and improved reliability of each vessel and the extra capacity that was available on board.

On 31 May 2016, ICG announced that it had entered into an agreement with the German company Flensburger Schiffbau-Gesellschaft to build a cruise ferry  at a contract price of €144 million. The new cruise ferry can accommodate 1,880 passengers and crew, with 435 cabins and with capacity for 2,800 lane metres of freight (165 freight vehicles) plus an additional dedicated car deck with capacity for 300 passenger cars. Summer 2018 bookings for the new ferry were cancelled due to delays in its delivery from the shipyard.

In March 2021, Irish Ferries in a surprise announcement revealed that they were opening a new route between Dover and Calais, due to start in June, later revealed to be June 29th. This is the first such route that Irish Ferries operates which does not call in Ireland, with Dover and Calais being two major UK and French ports respectively. The service began with the  operating between the two ports, with two more ships due to enter service – the MS Isle of Innisfree (1991, ex-Calais Seaways) in December 2021, and MS Ciudad de Mahón expected in Q1 2022 after rebranding and refurbishing work.

Awards
In 2001, the newly completed vessel Ulysses was awarded the title 'Most Significant Newbuild – Ferry' by Lloyds List Cruise & Ferry. In 2019, the latest addition to its fleet, W.B. Yeats was awarded the 'Ferry Concept Award' and the 'Interior Architecture Award' at the international Shippax Industry Awards.

Fleet
In 2005, Irish Ferries began to re-register its fleet under flags of convenience, enabling the company to save approximately €11.5 million by replacing crew with agency staff. As of February 2018, all vessels owned by Irish Ferries or Irish Continental Group are registered in either the Bahamas or Cyprus

Current fleet

Former ships

References

Bibliography

External links

Irish Continental Group (corporate)
Irish Ferries (consumer)
 (Irish ferries enthusiasts site)

Ferry companies of the Republic of Ireland
Ferry companies of Wales
Companies based in Dublin (city)
Irish companies established in 1973
Transport companies established in 1973